Beechina is a locality in the Shire of Mundaring in Western Australia. The word "Beechina" is the Nyungar name for a white gum valley to the northeast of the locality. It was first recorded by surveyor P. Chauncy in 1847, when he was carrying out the survey of the first road to Northam.
 
Beechina is in the electoral division of Hasluck.

Notes

References
 
 
 Beechina at Geoscience Australia

External links
Mundaring and Hills Historical Society website

Suburbs and localities in the Shire of Mundaring
Suburbs of Perth, Western Australia